A rood is a Christian cross or crucifix.

Rood may also refer to:

Rood (surname)
ROOD, a Dutch political youth organisation
Rood (unit), an English unit of length or area
Rood (Scots), a Scottish unit of area
"Rood" (song), a 2006 song by Marco Borsato
Rood Building, a commercial building in Grand Rapids, Michigan
Rood Candy Company Building, a manufacturing plant in Pueblo, Colorado

See also
Rod (disambiguation)